Silk Sakkath Hot is a 2013 Indian Kannada-language biographical film written and directed by Trishul. The film was produced by Venkatappa and stars Veena Malik, making her debut in South India, in the lead role. The supporting cast consists of Akshay, Sana, Anitha Bhat  and Srinivasa Murthy. Jassie Gift composed the music while Jai Anand was the cinematographer.

The film portrays the story of an aspiring actress who is ready to go to any extent to make it big in the cinema industry. It was inspired by the life of Silk Smitha, a South Indian actress noted for her erotic roles. Silk Sakkath Hot released to mixed reviews and was financially successful. It was also film was dubbed in Telugu as Red Mirchi.

Cast
 Veena Malik as Silk
 Akshay as Shiva
 Sana as Ammani
 Anitha Bhat as Ragini
 Srinivasa Murthy
 Avinash
 Sadhu Kokila
 Achyuth Kumar
 Stephanie Siriwardhana as item number

Release
Silk Sakkath Hot opened across 150 Theaters in Karnataka. Silk Sakkath Hot "is touted to be the biggest Blockbuster in Sandalwood raising the bar of film making in the region. It's been going housefull all over Karnataka." It completed a 100 days run in Bangalore's Kailash theatre.

Soundtrack

Jassie Gift has composed 5 songs to the lyrics of Kaviraj.

References

External links
 

2013 films
2010s Kannada-language films
Indian biographical drama films
HIV/AIDS in Indian films
Films about prostitution in India
Indian pregnancy films